Chongxi Pagoda is a Ming-era pagoda located in Duanzhou District, Zhaoqing, Guangdong, China.

History
Chongxi Pagoda was first built in 1582 and completed in 1585. It was built to "lock" the Xi River dragon which was believed to be behind river floods. The pagoda was in disrepair following the Cultural Revolution and was renovated in 1984.

Description
Built with bricks and stones in an octagonal shape, Chongxi Pagoda stands 57.5 meters tall. There are nine exterior stories and 17 interior stories. The granite base is 1.84 meters tall and 46.5 meters in perimeter.

References

Pagodas in China
Buildings and structures in Zhaoqing
Ming dynasty architecture
1585 establishments
1580s establishments in China